Polk Township is one of eleven townships in Atchison County, Missouri, United States. As of the 2010 census, its population was 226.

Polk Township was established in 1845, and named after President James K. Polk.

Geography
Polk Township covers an area of and contains no incorporated settlements. It contains six cemeteries:  High Creek, Linden, St. John's Lutheran, Grange Hall, Noblitt-gibson, and Steiner.

The streams of McElroy Creek, High Creek, West High Creek, and Hall Branch run through this township.

References

 USGS Geographic Names Information System (GNIS)

External links
 US-Counties.com
 City-Data.com

Townships in Atchison County, Missouri
Townships in Missouri